Melnikov is a surname of Russian origin. Like many surnames, it derives from an occupation. The root "" (melnik) meaning miller, means 'one who mills grain'.

It may refer to:
Alexander Melnikov, multiple people including:
Alexander Melnikov (pianist) (born 1973), Russian pianist
Alexander Melnikov (politician) (1930–2011), Russian politician
Andrey Melnikov (1968–1988), Soviet soldier
Angelina Melnikova (born 2000), Russian gymnast
Avraam Melnikov (1784–1854), Russian architect
Boris Melnikov (1938–2022), Soviet fencer
Ivan Melnikov, multiple people including:
Ivan Melnikov (baritone) (1832–1906), Russian baritone opera singer
Ivan Melnikov (footballer) (born 1997), Russian footballer
Ivan Melnikov (politician) (born 1950), Russian politician
Konstantin Melnikov (1890–1974), Russian architect
Leonid Melnikov (1906–1981), Soviet politician and diplomat
Nikita Melnikov (wrestler) (born 1987), Russian wrestler
Nikita Melnikov (footballer) (born 1997), Russian footballer
Nikolai Melnikov (born 1948), Soviet water polo player
Nikolay Melnikov (curler) (born 1964), Russian wheelchair curler
Pavel Melnikov, multiple people including:
Pavel Melnikov (rower) (born 1969), Russian rower
Pavel Ivanovich Melnikov (1818–1883), Russian writer
Pavel Petrovich Melnikov (1804–1880), Russian engineer
Sergey Melnikov (born 1968), Russian runner
Semyon Melnikov (born 1985), Russian footballer
Stepan Melnikov (born 2002), Russian footballer
Yakov Melnikov (1896–1960) was a Russian and Soviet speed skater
Vasily Melnikov (1943–2017), Soviet alpine skier
Viktor Melnikov (born 1944), Soviet rower
Vitaly Melnikov, multiple people including:
Vitaly Melnikov (film director) (1928–2022), Russian film director
Vitaly Melnikov (swimmer) (born 1990), Russian swimmer
Volodymyr Melnykov (born 1951), Ukrainian poet and composer
Vyacheslav Melnikov, multiple people including:
Vyacheslav Melnikov (footballer, born 1954), Russian footballer and coach
Vyacheslav Melnikov (footballer, born 1975), Russian footballer
Vyacheslav Melnikov (alpine skier) (born 1931), Soviet alpine skier
Yury Melnikov (born 1940), Russian diver

See also
Melnikova, feminine version of the surname
Melnikov distance
Melnikov Permafrost Institute, research institute in Yakutsk, Russia

Russian-language surnames
Occupational surnames